Hesperophymatus limexylon is a species of beetle in the family Cerambycidae. It was described by Zajciw in 1959.

References

Hesperophanini
Beetles described in 1959